Devosia pacifica is a Gram-negative, strictly aerobic, motile bacteria from the genus of Devosia with a single lateral flagellum which was isolated from sediments of the South China Sea.

References

Hyphomicrobiales
Gram-negative bacteria
Bacteria described in 2014